Amphitornus coloradus, known generally as the striped slant-face grasshopper or striped grasshopper, is a species of slant-faced grasshopper in the family Acrididae. It is found in Central America and North America.

Subspecies
These three subspecies belong to the species Amphitornus coloradus:
 Amphitornus coloradus coloradus (Thomas, 1873)
 Amphitornus coloradus ornatus McNeill, 1897
 Amphitornus coloradus saltator Hebard, 1937

References

Further reading

 

Gomphocerinae
Articles created by Qbugbot
Insects described in 1873